, born as , (February 8, 1956 – June 27, 2009) was a Japanese long-distance runner.

She was a high school teacher in Ōfunato, Iwate when she set a Japanese record of 2:40:56 at the Boston Marathon in 1981.

She quit running as an amateur and began her professional career with the S & B Foods Inc. Athletic Club, which included among its members her coach, Kiyoshi Nakamura, and Toshihiko Seko, then one of the top marathon runners in the world.

She set a new Japanese record of 2:35:00 at the Christchurch Marathon in June 1982.

She won the Tokyo International Women's Marathon in 1983, and she represented Japan at the 1984 Summer Olympics in Los Angeles, California, finishing the race in 19th place, at 2:37:04.

She retired from competition after setting her personal best time of 2:33:57 at the Nagoya Marathon in March 1995, and she then served as a coach at the S & B Athletic Club for a while.

On June 29, 2009, Japanese news media reported that she died on June 27 at the age of 53 due to colorectal cancer.

Achievements

References

External links
sports-reference

1956 births
2009 deaths
Japanese female long-distance runners
Olympic female long-distance runners
Olympic female marathon runners
Olympic athletes of Japan
Athletes (track and field) at the 1984 Summer Olympics
Japan Championships in Athletics winners
Nippon Sport Science University alumni
Deaths from cancer in Japan
Deaths from colorectal cancer
20th-century Japanese women
21st-century Japanese women